James Craggs may refer to:
James Craggs the Elder (1657–1721), English politician
James Craggs the Younger (1686–1721), English politician, son of the above